The 2022 Scottish Cup Final was the 137th final of the Scottish Cup and the final of the 2021–22 Scottish Cup, the most prestigious knockout football competition in Scotland. The match was played on 21 May 2022 at Hampden Park, Glasgow. St Johnstone, the defending champions were defeated in Round Four. Glasgow Rangers beat Heart of Midlothian 2-0 in extra time.

Route to the final

European place
The winner earns the right to play in the 2022–23 UEFA Europa League, entering in the Playoff round. The position of the clubs in the 2021–22 Scottish Premiership rendered this point moot, however, as Rangers had guaranteed a place in the 2022–23 UEFA Champions League, meaning Hearts will secure Europa League qualification by either winning the cup, or by finishing in third place in the league if the place defaults to the league because Rangers win the cup.

Pre-match
Going into the 2022 final, Rangers had won the Scottish Cup 33 times from 52 appearances in Scottish Cup finals. The 2022 final is their first appearance in the final since 2016, and they are seeking to win the cup for the first time since 2009. Heart of Midlothian had won the Scottish Cup 8 times from 16 appearances in the final. Their most recent appearance in the final was in 2020, and their most recent victory was in 2012. The clubs had previously met in the finals of 1903 (Rangers winning 2–0 in a second replay), 1976 (3–1 for Rangers), 1996 (5–1 for Rangers) and 1998 (2–1 for Hearts).

Match

Details

Media coverage
BBC Scotland and Premier Sports obtained the rights to broadcast the final, in what is the fourth season of a six-year deal in the United Kingdom to broadcast Scottish Cup matches.

References 

2021–22 in Scottish football cups
Scottish Cup Finals
Sports competitions in Glasgow
Scottish Cup Final
2020s in Glasgow
Scottish Cup Final 2022
Scottish Cup Final 2022